Viktorov is a Russian surname that is derived from the male given name Viktor and literally means Viktor's. Notable people with the surname include:

Maxim Viktorov (born 1972), Russian banker and politician
Mikhail Viktorov (1893–1938), Russian military leader

See also
17176 Viktorov, main-belt asteroid

Russian-language surnames
Patronymic surnames
Surnames from given names